Nicdali Rivera-Calanoc is an American mixed martial artist who competed in the Atomweight division. She was signed with Invicta FC. After her fight against Jodie Esquibel at Invicta FC 9, Nicdali announced that she had decided before the fight that it would be her last fight as she did not resign her contract. However, she would come out of retirement less than a year later for the Combate Americas promotion and continued her fighting career. After only a few more fights, she would again announce her retirement. In July 2017, she was named the fight director for Combate Americas.

Mixed martial arts record

|-
| Loss
| align=center| 9–10
| Lisbeth Lopez Silva
| Submission (rear-naked choke)
| Combate Americas: Combate 10
| 
| align=center| 1
| align=center| 3:07
| Mexico City, Mexico
|
|
|-
| Win
| align=center| 9–9
| Ronni Nanney
| Decision (split)
| FCF 51
| 
| align=center| 3
| align=center| 3:00
| Shawnee, Oklahoma, United States
| 
|-
| Loss
| align=center| 8–9
| Kyra Batara
| Decision (unanimous)
| Combate Americas: Road to the Championship 1
| 
| align=center| 3
| align=center| 5:00
| Las Vegas, Nevada, United States
| 
|-
| Loss
| align=center| 8–8
| Jodie Esquibel
| Decision (unanimous)
| Invicta FC 9: Honchak vs. Hashi
| 
| align=center| 3
| align=center| 5:00
| Davenport, Iowa, United States
| 
|-
| Loss
| align=center| 8–7
| Jessica Penne
| Submission (rear-naked choke)
| Invicta FC 6: Coenen vs. Cyborg
| 
| align=center| 1
| align=center| 4:57
| Kansas City, Missouri, United States
| 
|-
| Win
| align=center| 8–6
| Angelica Chavez
| Decision (unanimous)
| Invicta FC 2: Baszler vs. McMann
| 
| align=center| 3
| align=center| 5:00
| Kansas City, Kansas, United States
| 
|-
| Loss
| align=center| 7–6
| Amy Davis
| Submission (kimura)
| Invicta FC 1: Coenen vs. Ruyssen
| 
| align=center| 2
| align=center| 3:47
| Kansas City, Kansas, United States
| 
|-
| Loss
| align=center| 7–5
| Felice Herrig
| Decision (unanimous)
| XFO 39
| 
| align=center| 3
| align=center| 5:00
| Hoffman Estates, Illinois, United States
| 
|-
| Win
| align=center| 7–4
| Summer White
| TKO (punches)
| Maxx FC 11: The Nightmare
| 
| align=center| 1
| align=center| 3:12
| Ponce, Puerto Rico
| 
|-
| Loss
| align=center| 6–4
| Sally Krumdiack
| Decision (unanimous)
| Freestyle Cage Fighting 36
| 
| align=center| 3
| align=center| 5:00
| Shawnee, Oklahoma, United States
| 
|-
| Win
| align=center| 6–3
| Shoni Esquiro
| Decision (unanimous)
| Freestyle Cage Fighting 33
| 
| align=center| 3
| align=center| 5:00
| Durant, Oklahoma, United States
| 
|-
| Loss
| align=center| 5–3
| Miku Matsumoto
| TKO (knees to the body)
| Deep: 41 Impact
| 
| align=center| 1
| align=center| 0:21
| Tokyo, Japan
| 
|-
| Win
| align=center| 5–2
| Shawn Tamaribuchi
| Decision (unanimous)
| Freestyle Cage Fighting 22
| 
| align=center| 3
| align=center| 5:00
| Shawnee, Oklahoma, United States
| 
|-
| Loss
| align=center| 4–2
| Angela Magaña
| Decision (split)
| Freestyle Cage Fighting 19
| 
| align=center| 3
| align=center| 3:00
| Claremore, Oklahoma, United States
| 
|-
| Win
| align=center| 4–1
| Stephanie Palmer
| TKO (punches)
| Freestyle Cage Fighting 16
| 
| align=center| 1
| align=center| 1:24
| Tulsa, Oklahoma, United States
| 
|-
| Loss
| align=center| 3–1
| Patti Lee
| Submission (heel hook)
| HOOKnSHOOT Bodog Fight Women's Tournament
| 
| align=center| 1
| align=center| 2:59
| Evansville, Indiana, United States
| 
|-
| Win
| align=center| 3–0
| Jen Babcock
| KO (punches)
| HOOKnSHOOT Bodog Fight Women's Tournament
| 
| align=center| 1
| align=center| 0:30
| Evansville, Indiana, United States
| 
|-
| Win
| align=center| 2–0
| Tammie Schneider
| Decision (unanimous)
| Freestyle Cage Fighting 14
| 
| align=center| 3
| align=center| 3:00
| Shawnee, Oklahoma, United States
| 
|-
| Win
| align=center| 1–0
| Sarika Patel
| TKO (punches)
| ACF Showdown at Sundown
| 
| align=center| 1
| align=center| 2:03
| Stillwater, Oklahoma, United States
|

References

External links

1985 births
Living people
American female mixed martial artists
Atomweight mixed martial artists
21st-century American women